Boscobel is a civil parish in Shropshire, England.  It contains six listed buildings that are recorded in the National Heritage List for England.  Of these, one is listed at Grade II*, the middle of the three grades, and the others are at Grade II, the lowest grade.  The parish does not contain a significant settlement, and its major building is Boscobel House.  This is listed, and all the other listed buildings in the parish are associated with it.


Key

Buildings

References

Citations

Sources

Lists of buildings and structures in Shropshire